Monochamus thoas is a species of beetle in the family Cerambycidae. It was described by Dillon and Dillon in 1961.

References

thoas
Beetles described in 1961